The International Association of Transdisciplinary Psychology is an international association of researchers, scholars, and thinkers who take a transdisciplinary approach to the study of psychology. They aim to "describe...not what the human being is, but rather, what it is to be human."

Journal
Since 2009, the association has published a peer reviewed journal, The Journal of the International Association of Transdisciplinary Psychology annually.

References

External links
 Journal of The International Association of Transdisciplinary Psychology 
Psychology organizations